Matthieu Sans (born 16 June 1988) is a French former professional footballer who played as a defender. He is a currently a sports co-ordinator with Chamois Niortais.

Career
Born in Toulon, Sans began his career with Monaco but did not make a first-team appearance for the club before leaving in 2008. He later had spells with Arles and Corsican side Bastia, where he was part of the team that won successive promotions in 2010–11 and 2011–12 to reach Ligue 1. Sans spent the duration of the 2013–2014 season on loan at Championnat National club Gazélec Ajaccio.

On 23 July 2020, Sans signed for Annecy after his release from Chamois Niortais. On 21 October 2022, he retired from professional football to start working as a sport co-ordinator with his former club Chamois Niortais.

Career statistics

References

1988 births
Living people
Sportspeople from Toulon
French footballers
Association football defenders
AS Monaco FC players
AC Arlésien players
SC Bastia players
Gazélec Ajaccio players
Chamois Niortais F.C. players
FC Annecy players
Ligue 1 players
Ligue 2 players
Championnat National players
Championnat National 3 players
Footballers from Provence-Alpes-Côte d'Azur